There are currently six operating railway systems in Taiwan:

The two Inter-city rail systems, Taiwan Railways and Taiwan High Speed Rail, have several overlaps in station names. See below Taiwan High Speed Rail section for their relations in detail.

There are five rapid transit systems in Taiwan:
 Taipei Metro, opened in March 1996, serves the core of Taipei–Keelung metropolitan area.
 Kaohsiung Metro, opened in  March 2008, serves the core of Kaohsiung metropolitan area.
 Taoyuan Metro, opened in  March 2017, connects the cores of Taipei and Taoyuan with Taoyuan International Airport.
 New Taipei Metro, opened in December 2018, serves the Danhai New Town and New Taipei
 Taichung Metro, opened in April 2021, serves the core of Taichung–Changhua metropolitan area.

The Alishan Forest Railway is currently administered by Forestry Bureau as a heritage railway for tourists in Alishan National Scenic Area.

Station names in Taiwan are in Wade–Giles for major stations and in Hanyu Pinyin for other minor stations. Exceptions exist in Kaohsiung Metro, which uses Tongyong Pinyin in general. Other romanization systems also exists in some cases for private property or traditional place names. The law of Taiwan also requires all notifications in public transportation systems including station names shall be made in Mandarin, Taiwanese Hokkien, and Hakka.

Taiwan Railways 
The Taiwan Railways is operated by the governmental official Taiwan Railways Administration. It consists of the following lines
 Western main line: including West Coast line, Taichung line and Pingtung line.
 Eastern main line: including Yilan line, North-link line and Taitung line.
 South-link line
 Branch lines: Pingxi line, Neiwan line, Liujia line, Jiji line, Shalun line, Shen'ao line
Stations with special and first classes are shown in bold.

Operating stations

Closed stations

Taiwan High Speed Rail
The Taiwan High Speed Rail currently operates 12 stations in western Taiwan:
 Taiwan Railways have a station name identical to THSR in a union station or in nearby places: Banqiao, Nangang, Taipei.
 Taiwan Railways have a station name identical to THSR but in different places: Changhua, Chiayi, Hsinchu, Miaoli, Taichung, Tainan, Taoyuan, Zuoying.

Kaohsiung Rapid Transit System 
The Kaohsiung Rapid Transit System consists of three lines:  Red line,  Orange line, and  Circular light rail. There are in total 52 stations in total on the three lines.

New Taipei Metro 
The New Taipei Metro consists of one line, Danhai light rail, with 14 stations. Stations V01-V11 opened in 2018, and stations V26-V28 opened in 2020.

Taichung Metro 
The Taichung Metro consists of one line,  Green line, with 18 stations. The line officially opened on April 25, 2021.

Taipei Metro 
The Taipei Metro System consists of five lines:  Wenhu line,  Tamsui–Xinyi line,  Zhonghe–Xinlu line,  Songshan–Xindian line,  Bannan line. There are in total 117 stations in total on these lines.

Taoyuan Metro
Taoyuan Metro consists of one line,  Taoyuan Airport MRT, with 21 stations.

Alishan Forest Railway
The Alishan Forest Railway is owned and operated by Forestry Bureau. Currently four lines are in operation: Main line (Alishan line), Chushan line, Shenmu line, and Zhaoping line.

See also 
 Rail transport in Taiwan

References

Railway stations
Taiwan
Railway stations